is a Japanese judoka. Harasawa was considered a staple of Japanese heavyweight judo throughout the 2010s decade.

He competed at the 2016 Summer Olympics in Rio de Janeiro, in the men's +100 kg. where he won the silver medal on the final against gold medal winner Teddy Riner.

After being seeded #2 for the 2020 Summer Olympics in Tokyo, Harasawa once again faced Teddy Riner, this time for the men's +100 kg bronze medal. Riner defeated Harasawa by ippon.

References

External links

 
 
 
 

1992 births
Living people
Japanese male judoka
Olympic judoka of Japan
Judoka at the 2016 Summer Olympics
Judoka at the 2020 Summer Olympics
Olympic silver medalists for Japan
Olympic medalists in judo
Medalists at the 2016 Summer Olympics
Medalists at the 2020 Summer Olympics
Nihon University alumni
Sportspeople from Yamaguchi Prefecture
Universiade medalists in judo
People from Shimonoseki
World judo champions
Universiade gold medalists for Japan
Medalists at the 2015 Summer Universiade
21st-century Japanese people